Hans Tröger (29 August 1896  – 21 January 1982) was a German general in the Wehrmacht during World War II who commanded several panzer divisions. He was a recipient of the Knight's Cross of the Iron Cross, awarded by Nazi Germany to recognise successful military leadership.

Biography
Born in 1896, Tröger entered the army of Imperial Germany in 1915 as a Fahnenjunker (officer cadet) and served as an engineer. After World War I, he remained in the military, serving in the Reichsheer. From 1935 he was in the Wehrmacht and was posted to the Office of Mobile Troops at the Oberkommando der Wehrmacht (Armed Forces High Command), commonly known as OKW, for two years from 1938. Following the outbreak of World War II, he commanded of the 64th Motorcycle Battalion and then the 103rd Rifle Regiment. On 11 November 1942, he was appointed commander of the 27th Panzer Division, at the time engaged in fighting as it retreated from the Donets. In early 1943 he left the Eastern Front to take up an appointment as commander of the School for Panzer Troops, based in Germany.
 
He returned to divisional command when posted to the 25th Panzer Division on 20 November 1943. His new command was fighting on the Eastern Front around Kiev, in which it suffered heavy losses and further, significant, casualties were incurred in the retreat across the Ukraine. In April 1944, it was transferred to Denmark for a refit and Tröger, promoted to generalleutnant earlier that month, took over command of the 13th Panzer Division. In September, the division took part in the fighting around Khisinev but found itself cut off. It had to break out and while some personnel made it to the German lines, Tröger led one element into Bulgaria and was captured by Bulgarian troops. After a period of internment, he was later handed over to the Soviet Union. He remained a prisoner of war until 1955.

Awards and decorations
 Iron Cross (1914) 2nd Class & 1st Class
 Iron Cross (1939) 2nd Class & 1st Class
 German Cross in Gold (15 November 1941)
 Knight's Cross of the Iron Cross on 4 May 1944 as generalmajor and commander of 25th Panzer Division

Notes
Footnotes

Citations

References

 

 
 

1896 births
1982 deaths
Lieutenant generals of the German Army (Wehrmacht)
German Army personnel of World War I
Reichswehr personnel
Recipients of the clasp to the Iron Cross, 1st class
Recipients of the Gold German Cross
Recipients of the Knight's Cross of the Iron Cross
German prisoners of war in World War II held by the Soviet Union
People from Plauen
People from the Kingdom of Saxony
Military personnel from Saxony